Setina flavicans is a moth of the family Erebidae. It is found in France and on the Iberian Peninsula.

The wingspan is 28–31 mm for males and 20–25 mm for females.

The larvae feed on various lichen species.

Subspecies
Setina flavicans flavicans
Setina flavicans pseudoirrorela de Freina & Witt, 1985 (northern part of the Iberian Peninsula and the Pyrenees and its northern ranges)

References

External links

Lepiforum.de

Moths described in 1836
Endrosina
Moths of Europe
Taxa named by Carl Geyer